Botumegyabu is a village in Shama District in the Western Region of Ghana near the town Sekondi. Botumegyabu is in the Essikado-Ketan constituency of the Western region of Ghana. It is mainly a dormitory village.

References

Populated places in the Western Region (Ghana)